Shivpura railway station is a small railway station in Ujjain district, Madhya Pradesh. Its code is SVT.

Location 
It serves Shivpura village.

References

External links

Railway stations in Ujjain district
Ratlam railway division